is a Japanese politician of the Constitutional Democratic Party of Japan and a member of the House of Representatives in the Diet (national legislature).

Biography 

A native of Tokyo and graduate of George Washington University, he started his career in 1993 working for the political campaign of the New Party Sakigake alongside future Prime Minister Naoto Kan. Akutsu joined the formation of the Democratic Party of Japan in 1996. He ran under their ticket in the 1996 general election as a candidate for Tokyo 24th district, but lost. In 2000, he ran and won the race for Tokyo-24th and entered the Diet for the first time. He lost the district race in the 2003 election, but was re-elected through the Tokyo proportional representation block. In 2005, he ran as candidate for the Tokyo prefectural elections but lost. In 2009, he returned to the Diet but lost his seat in the 2012 elections.

After running unsuccessfully in 2014, Akutsu was elected back to the Diet after being elected from the CDP list for the Tohoku PR block in the 2017. He also currently serves as the deputy secretary-general of the party.

References

External links
 Official blog
 Official website (archived) in Japanese

Living people
1956 births
People from Tokyo
George Washington University alumni
Members of the House of Representatives (Japan)
Constitutional Democratic Party of Japan politicians
Democratic Party of Japan politicians
21st-century Japanese politicians